is a passenger railway station located in Kita-ku of the city of Okayama, Okayama Prefecture, Japan. It is operated by West Japan Railway Company (JR West).

Lines

Station layout
The station consists of two opposed side platforms on a slight embankment, connected by a footbridge.The station is unattended.

Platforms

History
Niwase Station opened on April 25, 1891 at the same time as the opening of the section between Okayama Station and Kurashiki Station on the Sanyo Railway.  The current station building was opened in 1986 and the building itself won the Railway Architectural Association's Station Architecture Award for 1985. With the privatization of the Japan National Railways (JNR) on April 1, 1987, the station came under the aegis of the West Japan Railway Company.

Passenger statistics
In fiscal 2019, the station was used by an average of 4341 passengers daily.

See also
List of railway stations in Japan

References

External links

 Niwase Station Official Site

Railway stations in Okayama
Sanyō Main Line
Railway stations in Japan opened in 1891